Jerzy Janowicz was the defending champion but decided to participate in the 2013 Mutua Madrid Open instead.
Aljaž Bedene defeated Filippo Volandri 6–4, 6–2 in the final to win the title.

Seeds

Draw

Finals

Top half

Bottom half

References
 Main Draw
 Qualifying Draw

Roma Openandnbsp;- Singles
2013 Singles